In enzymology, a luteolin O-methyltransferase is an enzyme that catalyzes the chemical reaction

S-adenosyl-L-methionine + 5,7,3',4'-tetrahydroxyflavone  S-adenosyl-L-homocysteine + 5,7,4'-trihydroxy-3'-methoxyflavone

Thus, the two substrates of this enzyme are S-adenosyl methionine and 5,7,3',4'-tetrahydroxyflavone (luteolin), whereas its two products are S-adenosylhomocysteine and 5,7,4'-trihydroxy-3'-methoxyflavone.

This enzyme belongs to the family of transferases, specifically those transferring one-carbon group methyltransferases.  The systematic name of this enzyme class is S-adenosyl-L-methionine:5,7,3',4'-tetrahydroxyflavone 3'-O-methyltransferase. Other names in common use include o-dihydric phenol methyltransferase, luteolin methyltransferase, luteolin 3'-O-methyltransferase, o-diphenol m-O-methyltransferase, o-dihydric phenol meta-O-methyltransferase, and S-adenosylmethionine:flavone/flavonol 3'-O-methyltransferase.  This enzyme participates in flavonoid biosynthesis.

References 

 

EC 2.1.1
Enzymes of unknown structure
O-methylated flavones metabolism